Mala mujer is a common name for several herbaceous plants in the genus Cnidoscolus with stinging hairs and may refer to:

 Cnidoscolus angustidens, native to Arizona and northwestern Mexico
 Cnidoscolus stimulosus, native to the southeastern United States from Louisiana to Virginia
 Cnidoscolus texanus, native to the south central United States

Music
 "Mala Mujer", a song by Spanish recording artist C. Tangana